Scythris xenonympha is a moth in the family Scythrididae. It is found in Australia, where it has been recorded from New South Wales.

The wingspan is 8–10 mm. The forewings are white, finely dusted with fuscous and with three fuscous dots. The hindwings are pale fuscous.

References

xenonympha